This is a list of world champions in professional boxing who retired undefeated, either during or after a title reign(s). It excludes current titleholders. Each champion's record is shown in the following format: wins–losses–draws.

Undefeated male champions

Undefeated female champions
Includes world titles from sanctioning agencies outside of WBA, WBC, WBO, IBF and outside of The Ring. Female world titles were inaugurated by the IBF, WBA, WBC, and WBO in 2010, 2004, 2005, and 2009 respectively. The Ring began awarding titles to women in 2019 and six of the fifteen weight classes are still uninaugurated (as of September 30, 2022).

See also
List of current world boxing champions
List of current female world boxing champions
Longest reigning heavyweight champions

References

Undefeated boxing world champions